The Bundesstraße 300 or B 300 is one of the German federal highways crossing southern Bavaria from Memmingen in direction to Regensburg via Krumbach (Swabia), Augsburg und Aichach.

In Augsburg the B 300 and the B2 respectively the B17 run short distances on the same roads. In Augsburg, Neusäß, Stadtbergen and near the Bundesautobahn 8 the B 300 has two lanes of traffic in each direction (dual carriageway). In the valley of the river Paar most parts of the road has in all three lanes of traffic (2+1 road).

The part of the B 300 between Dasing and Aichach was part of the planned but not constructed Bundesautobahn 90. It is planned that this section of the B 300 will be constructed like a Bundesautobahn with two lanes of traffic in each direction from the year 2010 on.

Route / Junctions

300
Roads in Bavaria
Transport in Günzburg (district)